Billbergia porteana is a plant species in the genus Billbergia. This species is native to Brazil and Paraguay.

Cultivars
 Billbergia 'Thelma Darling Hodge'

References

porteana
Flora of Brazil
Plants described in 1856
Flora of Paraguay